Michael Joseph Mottau (born March 19, 1978) is an American former professional ice hockey defenseman who played in the National Hockey League (NHL). He was drafted in the seventh round, 182nd overall, by the New York Rangers in the 1997 NHL Entry Draft. Mottau was born in Boston, Massachusetts, but grew up in Avon, Massachusetts.  He currently works as a Business Development Manager for Sunrise Erectors.

Playing career
Mottau played four years of college hockey at Boston College, and was the recipient of the Hobey Baker Award for top men's collegiate hockey player during his senior season.  He made his National Hockey League debut with the Rangers during the 2000–01 season.  He played nineteen games with the Rangers over two seasons, and four with the Calgary Flames during the 2002–03 season.  Mottau played four seasons in the American Hockey League before returning to the NHL in the 2007–08 season with the New Jersey Devils. On September 28, 2010, Mottau signed a two-year deal with the New York Islanders.

On February 27, 2012, Mottau was traded with Brian Rolston to the Boston Bruins in exchange for Yannick Riendeau and Marc Cantin.

With the 2012–13 NHL lockout negating his chance of a NHL contract, Mottau was signed to a professional try-out deal with the San Antonio Rampage of the AHL on December 7, 2012. Mottau produced 7 assists in 16 games before he was released at the conclusion of the lockout to sign a one-year contract with the Toronto Maple Leafs on January 13, 2013.

On July 5, 2013 the Florida Panthers Executive VP & General Manager Dale Tallon announced that the club has agreed to terms with D Mike Mottau on a one-year, two way contract.

On August 19, 2014, Mottau announced his retirement.

Career statistics

Regular season and playoffs

International

Awards and honors

References

External links

1978 births
American men's ice hockey defensemen
Boston Bruins players
Boston College Eagles men's ice hockey players
Calgary Flames players
Chicago Blackhawks scouts
Cincinnati Mighty Ducks players
Florida Panthers players
Hartford Wolf Pack players
Hobey Baker Award winners
Ice hockey people from Massachusetts
Living people
Lowell Devils players
New Jersey Devils players
New York Islanders players
New York Rangers draft picks
New York Rangers players
Sportspeople from Quincy, Massachusetts
Peoria Rivermen (AHL) players
Saint John Flames players
San Antonio Rampage players
Thayer Academy alumni
Toronto Marlies players
Worcester IceCats players
People from Norfolk County, Massachusetts
AHCA Division I men's ice hockey All-Americans
Ice hockey players from Massachusetts